József Takács (30 June 1904 – 3 September 1983) was a Hungarian international footballer who earned 32 international caps between 1923 and 1933, scoring 26 goals. He was also selected in Hungary's squad for the 1924 Summer Olympics, but he did not play in any matches. Takács, who played as a striker, played club football for Vasas and Ferencváros.

See also 
 List of men's footballers with 500 or more goals

References 

1904 births
1983 deaths
Hungarian footballers
Hungary international footballers
Olympic footballers of Hungary
Footballers at the 1924 Summer Olympics
Association football forwards
Footballers from Budapest